Eucrostes indigenata is a moth of the family Geometridae first described by Charles Joseph Devillers in 1789. It is found in the Mediterranean region, inland up to North Macedonia and Hungary. Subspecies lanjeronica is found in southern Spain and Algeria.

The wingspan is 14–16 mm for males and 18–20 mm for females. There are two to three generations per year. Adults are on wing from April to October. On Malta, adults have been recorded up to the beginning of November.

The larvae feed on Euphorbia species, including E. spinosa, E. pinea, E. cyparissias, E. virgata and E. platyphyllos. The species overwinters in the larval stage.

Subspecies
Eucrostes indigenata indigenata
Eucrostes indigenata lanjeronica Hausmann, 1996 (Spain, Algeria)

References

External links

Moths and Butterflies of Europe and North Africa

Lepiforum e.V.

Hemitheini
Moths of Europe
Insects of Turkey
Moths described in 1789
Taxa named by Charles Joseph Devillers